Rughidia milleri is a species of flowering plant in the family Apiaceae.
It is endemic to Yemen.
Its natural habitat is rocky areas.

References

External links
 Rughidia milleri in ZipcodeZoo.com

milleri
Endemic flora of Socotra
Vulnerable plants
Taxonomy articles created by Polbot